KSCV may refer to:

 Kösener Senioren-Convents-Verband
 KSCV (FM), a radio station (90.1 FM) licensed to Springfield, Missouri, United States